Flap Your Wings may refer to:

 "Flap Your Wings" (song), a 2004 song by Nelly
 Flap Your Wings (The Choir album), a 2000 album by The Choir